Sheykh Amer (also Romanized as Sheykh ‘Āmer; also known as Shaikh ‘Umar, Sheykh Āmerī, and Sheykh ‘Omar) is a village in Chah Varz Rural District, in the Central District of Lamerd County, Fars Province, Iran. At the 2006 census, its population was 1,575, in 279 families.

References 

Populated places in Lamerd County